The 2022–23 Kerala Premier League is the tenth season of the Kerala Premier League. The regular season features 22 teams and plays on multiple venues.

Qualifiers

Promoted teams:
 Payyannur College
 Kerala Blasters B
 FC Kerala

Teams
KFA

Number of teams by region

Managerial changes

Venues

Foreign players

Group stage
<onlyinclude>

Group A
<onlyinclude>

Group B
<onlyinclude>

Group C
<onlyinclude>

Championship Round

Super Six
<onlyinclude>

Fixtures
Super Six fixtures were announced on 16 February 2023.
Source:

Semi Finals

Final

Statistics

Top scorers
As of 19 March 2023

See also
2022–23 Indian State Leagues
2022–23 Bangalore Super Division

References

Kerala Premier League seasons
2022–23 in Indian football leagues
2022–23 in Indian football